Eurytides is a genus of butterflies in the family Papilionidae, found in North, Central, and South America.

Species
The following species are recognised in the genus Eurytides:

Subgenus Bellerographium Möhn, 2002
 Eurytides bellerophon (Dahlman, 1823)

Subgenus Eurytides
 Eurytides salvini (Bates, 1864) – Salvin's kite swallowtail
 Eurytides columbus (Kollar, 1850)
 Eurytides orabilis (Butler, 1872) – thick-edged kite swallowtail
 Eurytides serville (Godart, 1824) – Serville swordtail
 Eurytides callias (Rothschild & Jordan, 1906) – Callias kite swallowtail
 Eurytides dolicaon (Cramer, [1776]) – dolicaon kite swallowtail
 Eurytides iphitas Hübner, [1821] – yellow kite swallowtail
Subgenus Neographium  Möhn, 2002:
 Eurytides epidaus (E. Doubleday, 1846), Mexican kite-swallowtail - Mexico (Yucatan); Honduras
 Eurytides agesilaus (Guérin-Méneville & Percheron, 1835) - Colombia
 Eurytides marcellus (Cramer, 1777), Zebra swallowtail - eastern USA & Canada
 Eurytides zonaria (A. Butler, 1869), Hispaniolan kite-swallowtail - Hispaniola
 Eurytides anaxilaus (C. Felder & R. Felder, 1865), small kite-swallowtail - Panama, northern Colombia, N Venezuela
 Eurytides celadon (Lucas, 1852), Cuban kite-swallowtail - Cuba & Isla de Juventud
 Eurytides marcellinus (E. Doubleday, [1845]), Jamaican kite-swallowtail - Jamaica  
 Eurytides thyastes Drury, 1782) - Brazil
 Eurytides calliste (H. Bates, 1864), Yellow kite-swallowtail - Guatemala
 Eurytides dioxippus (Hewitson, [1856]), thick-bordered kite-swallowtail - Colombia
 Eurytides leucaspis (Godart, 1819) - Peru?
 Eurytides asius (Fabricius, 1781) - South America

Former species:
 Protographium philolaus (Boisduval, 1836) – dark kite swallowtail, formerly E. philolaus

Some species have been moved to genus Mimoides.

References

 Möhn, Edwin (2002). Schmetterlinge der Erde, Butterflies of the World Part XIIII (14), Papilionidae VIII: Baronia, Euryades, Protographium, Neographium, Eurytides. Edited by Erich Bauer and Thomas Frankenbach Keltern:Goecke & Evers; Canterbury:Hillside Books.  All species and subspecies are included, also most of the forms. Several females are shown the first time in colour.

 
Papilionidae
Papilionidae of South America
Butterfly genera
Taxa named by Jacob Hübner
Taxonomy articles created by Polbot